{{DISPLAYTITLE:C7H16FO2P}}
The molecular formula C7H16FO2P (molar mass: 182.17 g/mol, exact mass: 182.0872 u) may refer to:

 GH (also known as EA-1211)
 Soman, or GD

Molecular formulas